Gujranwala District (Punjabi and ), is a district that is a part of the Majha region in Punjab, Pakistan. Gujranwala District is bordered by the districts of Wazirabad, Sialkot, Hafizabad and Sheikhupura. Gujranwala district has 5 National Assembly and 12 Punjab Assembly constituencies.

History 
Gujranwala belongs to the Majha region of ancient Punjab. The village of Asarur has been identified as the location of Taki, an ancient town, visited by the Chinese pilgrim Hiuen Tsiang contains immense ruins of Buddhist origin. After the time of Tsiang little is known about Gujranwala till the Islamic conquests, by this time, however, Taki had fallen into oblivion while Lahore had become the capital of Punjab. The contemporary village of Asarur has been identified as the site of the ancient city. From the beginning of the 7th century Gurjar  kingdoms dominated Eastern portions of Pakistan and northern India. The district flourished during Mughal rule, from the days of Akbar to those of Aurangzeb, wells were scattered over the whole country, and villages lay thickly dotted about the southern plateau, now a barren waste of grass land and scrub jungle. Their remains may still be found in the wildest and most solitary reaches of the Bar. The Punjab region became predominantly Muslim due to missionary Sufi saints whose dargahs dot the landscape of Punjab region.

Eminabad and Hafizabad were the chief towns (the latter now part of a separate district), while the country was divided into six well-tilled parganas. But before the end of the Islamic period the tract was mysteriously depopulated. The tribes at present occupying the District are all immigrants of recent date, and before their advent the whole region seems for a time to have been almost entirely abandoned. The only plausible conjecture to account for this sudden and disastrous change is that it resulted from the constant wars by which the Punjab was convulsed during the last years of Mughal Imperial rule.

After the decline of the Mughal Empire following Aurangzeb's death in 1707, the Afsharids in 1739 under their powerful Turko-Iranian conqueror Nadir Shah destroyed what remained of the once powerful Mughal Empire. Between 1747 and 1772 the Durrani Afghans of Ahmad Shah Abdali and the Sikh Misls vied for control of the region following the power vacuum left by the Mughals. Eventually the Sikh Sukerchakia Misl of Charat Singh won out and occupied the area of Gujranwala making it his new capital.

Punjabi Muslim Chathas (Jats) and Bhattis (Rajputs) maintained a sturdy independence. In the end, however, the Sukerchakia misl succeeded in bringing both under its power. Maha Singh’s son Ranjit Singh, founder of the Sikh Empire, was born in Gujranwala.

In 1849, the district was occupied by the British East India Company who annexed the entirety of the Sikh empire after defeating them in the Second Anglo-Sikh War. A cantonment was established at Wazirabad, which was abolished in 1855. The District formed a part originally of the extensive District of Wazirabad, which comprised the whole upper portion of the Rechna Doab.

In 1852 this unwieldy territory was divided between Gujranwala and Sialkot District. The District, as then constituted, stretched across the entire plateau, from the Chenab to the Ravi; but in 1853 the south-eastern fringe, consisting of 303 villages, was transferred to Lahore District, and three years later a second batch of 324 villages was handed over to the same District. There was no outbreak during the Indian Rebellion of 1857 and the Hindus and Sikh rallied to the side of Government with the greatest enthusiasm while Muslims rallied for the Mughals. According to the 1901 census the District had a population of 890,577 and contained 8 towns and 1,331 villages. Its population according to the 1881 census was 616,892 rising to 690,169 in 1891. The population increased by 29 per cent between 1891 and 1901 - the increase being greatest in the Hafizabad and Khangah Dogran tahsils, owing to the extension of canal-irrigation and the colonisation of the Bar. At the time the district was divided into four tehsils, namely: Gujranwala, Wazirabad, Hafizabad and Khangah Dogran (the headquarters of each being at the place from which it is named). The chief towns during British rule were the municipalities of Gujranwala, the headquarters of the District, Wazirabad, Rasulnagar, Ali Pur Chattha, Eminabad, Qila Didar Singh, and the notified area of Sodhra. During the British era, the district of Gujranwala was part of Lahore Division.

Demography 

At the time of the 2017 census, the population was 5,011,066, of which 2,528,990 were males and 2,481,457 females. Rural population was 2,061,948 while the urban population was 2,949,118. Islam is the predominant religion with 96.28% of the population while Christians are 3.60% of the population.

At the time of the 2017 census, 95.65% of the population spoke Punjabi and 2.51% Urdu as their first language.

Major tribes are Ansari, Gujjars, Jats, Awans, and Sayyids.

According to the 1998 census, the population of the district was 3,400,940, of which % were urban.

Administration 
Gujranwala is in fact a City district. The district is divided into the following tehsils:

 Gujranwala City
 Gujranwala Saddar
 Kamoke
 Nowshera Virkan

Furthermore, there are the following towns under these tehsils:

 Khiali Shahpure Town
 Aroop Town
 Nandipur Town
 Qila Didar Singh Town
 Kamoke Town
 Naushehra Virkan Town

The first four towns lie in Gujranwala City and Saddar tehsils while the last two towns are under their respective tehsils, i.e. Tehsil Kamoke and Naushehra Virkan respectively.

Gujranwala is the district headquarters while Gujranwala, Kamoke and Naushehra Virkan are tehsil headquarters.

Transport links

Rail

The main Peshawar-Karachi railway line passes through Gujranwala district. The district is linked with Sialkot, Hafizabad and Gujrat districts through railway network.

Economy
Gujranwala District is 3rd largest industrial city of Pakistan, and important player in famous Golden Triangle of Pakistan. Gujranwala contributes at least 5% to the GDP of Pakistan. Gujranwala is largest manufacturer of sanitary fittings, textiles, plastic furniture, pots, room coolers and heaters, gas stove and agricultural tools and equipments. Pakistan's supreme quality Basmati Rice is grown in this region.

See also

 Gujranwala
 Gujranwala Division
 Gujranwala Medical College
 Gujranwala railway station
 Districts of Pakistan
 Punjab, Pakistan
 Karachi–Peshawar Line
 Gujranwala Electric Power Company
 Jinnah Stadium, Gujranwala
 Gurjar
 Uggu Chak

References

External links 

 Punjab Government website

 
Districts of Punjab, Pakistan